Moulay Bouazza is a town in Khénifra Province, Béni Mellal-Khénifra, Morocco. According to the 2004 census it has a population of 5,241.

The town was named after a famous religious leader of the 12th-century called Abu Yaaza.

References

Populated places in Khénifra Province